Polondava (Polonda) was a Dacian town, north of Dinogetia.

See also 
 Dacian davae
 List of ancient cities in Thrace and Dacia
 Dacia
 Roman Dacia

References 

Sources

Further reading 

Dacian towns